TagesWoche is a Swiss German-language online newspaper, with a weekly Friday printed edition, published in Basel, Switzerland by Neue Medien Basel AG.

History and operation
The newspaper's first edition appeared on 28 October 2011.  It was created in reaction to the events surrounding Basler Zeitung, the traditional daily newspaper of Basel, which had financial problems and was finally sold in November 2010.

Its editors-in-chief were Urs Buess and Remo Leupin, who led a staff of seventeen people, many of whom were formerly journalists at Basler Zeitung. On 17 May 2013, a new editor-in-chief was appointed: Dani Winter.

See also
 List of newspapers in Switzerland

References

External links
 tageswoche.ch (in German), the newspaper's official website

2011 establishments in Switzerland
Swiss news websites
German-language newspapers published in Switzerland
Mass media in Basel
Publications established in 2011
Weekly newspapers published in Switzerland